Spartanburg Community College (SCC) is a public community college in Spartanburg, South Carolina. The college serves the citizens of Spartanburg, Cherokee, and Union counties in Upstate South Carolina.

Campuses
Spartanburg Community College has multiple locations:
Spartanburg Giles Campus (main location), in Spartanburg County, South Carolina
Tyger River Campus in Duncan, South Carolina
Cherokee County Campus in Gaffney, South Carolina
Union County Campus in Union, South Carolina
Downtown Campus in Spartanburg, South Carolina

See also
 Frank Evans High School

References

External links
Official website

Universities and colleges accredited by the Southern Association of Colleges and Schools
Education in Spartanburg County, South Carolina
Education in Cherokee County, South Carolina
Education in Union County, South Carolina
Buildings and structures in Spartanburg, South Carolina
Buildings and structures in Cherokee County, South Carolina
Buildings and structures in Union County, South Carolina
South Carolina Technical College System
1963 establishments in South Carolina